Mackmyra Whisky is a Swedish single malt whisky distillery. It is named after the village and manor of Mackmyra, where the first distillery was established, in the residential district of Valbo, south-west of Gävle. The toponym is commonly suggested as deriving from owlet moths (Swedish: nattflyn) and mire (Swedish: myr). However, owlet moths have all but disappeared from present-day Mackmyra, due to the gradual rebound of land—a result of the melting of ice sheets 10,000 years ago.

Mackmyra Svensk Whisky AB is a publicly traded company, listed in December 2011 on Nasdaq OMX's alternative-investment market First North. The company has about 45 employees with annual revenues of around SEK 100 million, and its biggest shareholder is the Swedish farmer's co-op Lantmännen.

History

Mackmyra's history started in 1998 at a Swedish winter resort, where eight friends from the Royal Institute of Technology met up for a ski trip. Noticing all of them had brought along a bottle of malt whisky for the host, a conversation started about the manufacturing of a Swedish whisky. The following year a company was founded, and after years of experimenting with 170 different recipes, they finally settled on two recipes in 2002. That same year a new distillery was built in the old mill and power station at Mackmyra, which went on stream in October. The first limited edition single malt whisky, Preludium 01, launched in February 2006 and sold-out in less than 20 minutes.

Production

All ingredients used in the production are sourced within a 75-mile radius from Mackmyra, except for the yeast, which is from Rotebro. The water undergoes a natural filtration process in an esker nearby and is only sterilized with a high-intensity UV light. The peat is from a local bog near Österfärnebo, and the distillery uses barley from Dalarna and Strömsta Manor in Enköping.

Mackmyra bottles all of its wares in their natural color, without additives, and ages their spirits in four different cask types: bourbon, sherry, Swedish oak and in a special signature cask made from classic American bourbon casks and Swedish oak. The whisky is generally matured 50 meters below ground in the disused Bodås Mine in Hofors, and most releases have been at cask strength, except for The First Edition and Mackmyra Brukswhisky.

Distilleries

Mackmyra has two active distilleries. The first went on stream at Mackmyra in 2002, featuring a full-sized pot still from Forsyth's in Rothes, Scotland, Swedish stainless steel washbacks and a German mash tun, with a production capacity of 600,000 bottles a year.

A second distillery, about 6 miles east of Mackmyra village, was built and went on stream in 2011. The project cost has been estimated at SEK 50 million, featuring two full-sized pot stills with a production capacity of 1.8 M bottles a year. It's seven storeys high, using gravity to power many internal processes within the distillery, resulting in about 45% less energy use compared to the first distillery.

Products

Standard Range

 The First Edition (ABV 46.1%) - Introduced in 2008, and the first Swedish whisky produced in large volumes since Skeppets Whisky.
 Mackmyra Brukswhisky (ABV 41.1%) – Introduced in 2010, and sold internationally as The Swedish Whisky.
 Mackmyra Svensk Rök (ABV 46.1%) – Introduced in 2013, and the first Swedish single malt whisky with a smoky flavor.

Special edition bottlings

 Mackmyra Midvinter  – A limited edition series, launched in November 2013.
 Mackmyra Midnattssol - A limited editions series, launched in May 2014.
 Mackmyra Moment – A series of whiskies from handpicked casks selected by the master blender.
 Mackmyra Reserve – A single barrel whisky made to order and stored until ready to drink in 30-litre casks. The customer picks recipe and cask type. 
 Mackmyra 10 år – 10-year-old limited edition whisky.

Past special edition bottlings

 Mackmyra Preludium – 2006-2007 
 Mackmyra Privus – 2006
 Mackmyra Special – 2008-2013

Other spirits

 Vit Hund (ABV 46.1%) - An unmatured raw whisky
 Bee (ABV 22%) - A whisky and honey liqueur

Awards

Mackmyra have won several awards at international spirit competitions. For example:

 Mackmyra Brukswhisky have been named "European Whisky of the Year" by Jim Murray in the Whisky Bible, and was awarded gold by The International Wine and Spirit Competition (IWSC) in 2010.
 In 2012, Mackmyra received a trophy as the "European Spirits Producer of the Year" by the IWSC, and was awarded gold for Moment Skog and Mackmyra Special 08. Gold have also previously been awarded in 2011 for The First Edition, Moment Drivved, Moment Medvind and Mackmyra Reserve.
 In 2013 the distillery was awarded Gold Outstanding by the IWSC and Three Golden Stars by the International Taste and Quality Institute for Moment Glöd single malt whisky.

See also

 List of whisky brands
 Single malt whisky

References

External links

 Official Mackmyra Website (in English)
 Swedish Whisky (in English)

Coordinates: 
Distilleries
Swedish distilled drinks
Food and drink companies of Sweden
Companies based in Gävleborg County